Planktosalinus is a Gram-negative, strictly heterotrophic and aerobic genus of bacteria from the family of Flavobacteriaceae with one known species (Planktosalinus lacus). Planktosalinus lacus has been isolated from the Lake Xiaochaidan in China.

References

Flavobacteria
Bacteria genera
Monotypic bacteria genera
Taxa described in 2016